The following is a list of notable deaths in May 1995.

Entries for each day are listed alphabetically by surname. A typical entry lists information in the following sequence:
 Name, age, country of citizenship at birth, subsequent country of citizenship (if applicable), reason for notability, cause of death (if known), and reference.

May 1995

1
Erwin Leonard Guy Abel, 83, New Zealand businessman.
Reuel Denney, 82, American poet and academic.
Carl S. Herz, 65, American-Canadian mathematician.
George MacKinnon, 89, American politician, attorney, and judge.
Mikhail Zimyanin, 80, Soviet/Russian politician and diplomat.

2
Luciano Anceschi, 84, Italian literary critic and essayist.
Edwin Blum, 88, American screenwriter.
Albert Bousser, 89, Luxembourgish politician, railway inspector, and trade unionist.
Don Brockett, 65, American actor (Mister Rogers' Neighborhood, Flashdance, The Silence of the Lambs), heart attack.
John Bunting, 76, Australian public servant and diplomat.
Sir Michael Hordern, 83, English actor (The Dock Brief, Barry Lyndon, Watership Down), kidney disease.
Allan O. Hunter, 78, American politician.
Manfred Kersch, 81, German athlete.
Rudolf Perešin, 37, Croatian fighter pilot, killed in action.
Dežo Ursiny, 47, Slovak rock musician, screenwriter and director.
Werner Veigel, 66, Dutch-German journalist and news presenter, brain cancer.
Keith Zettlemoyer, 39, American convicted murderer, execution by lethal injection.

3
John Warren Aldrich, 89, American ornithologist.
Johnny Leonard, 91, Australian rules football player and coach.
Adele Marcus, 89, American pianist and music educator.
Adolf Schlyßleder, 85, German film editor and assistant director.
Bruno Torpigliani, 80, Italian prelate of the Catholic Church.

4
Arne Arnardo, 82, Norwegian circus performer and owner.
Murray Barr, 86, Canadian physician and medical researcher.
Cornelio Fabro, 83, Italian Catholic priest.
Thomas Anthony Harris, 85, American psychiatrist and author, heart attack.
Louis Krasner, 91, Ukrainian-American violinist.
Hitomi Nozoe, 58, Japanese actress popular in the 1950s and early 1960s, cancer.
Lewis Thompson Preston, 68, American banker, CEO of J.P. Morgan & Co. and president of the World Bank.
Connie Wisniewski, 73, American baseball player, cancer.

5
Josef Bek, 76, Czech film and television actor.
Mikhail Botvinnik, 83, Russian chess player, pancreatic cancer.
David Connell, 63-64, American television producer (Sesame Street, The Electric Company).
Geno DeNobile, 62, Canadian football player.
Earl Faircloth, 74, American politician and lawyer.
Richard D. McCarthy, 67, American politician.
Nagabhushanam, 73, Indian actor and comedian.
Alastair Pilkington, 75, British engineer and businessman.
Ye Qianyu, 88, Chinese painter and pioneering manhua artist.
Edward W. Snedeker, 92, United States Marine Corps lieutenant general.
Anthony Wagner, 86, English Officer of Arms at the College of Arms.

6
John Black Aird, 72, Canadian lawyer, corporate director and political figure.
Maria Pia de Saxe-Coburgo e Bragança, 88, Portuguese writer and journalist.
Noel Brotherston, 38, Northern Irish footballer, heart attack.
Bucky Calabrese, 67, American upright bassist.
Ippolito Gonzalez, 40, American police sergeant.
Gottfried Haberler, 94, Austrian-American economist.
Adriano Mantelli, 82, Italian aircraft designer.
Georgios Mavros, 86, Greek jurist and politician.
Clarence Paul, 67, American songwriter, record producer and singer, diabetes.

7
Katharine Banham, 97, English psychologist who specialized in developmental psychology.
Gus Bell, 66, American Major League Baseball player (Pittsburgh Pirates, Cincinnati Reds, New York Mets, Milwaukee Braves).
María Luisa Bemberg, 73, Argentine film writer, director and actress, cancer.
Ray Buckton, 72, British trade unionist.
Clifford Clogg, 45, American sociologist, demographer, and statistician.
Ernest H. Martin, 75, American Broadway and film producer of musicals.
Ray McKinley, 84, American jazz drummer, singer, and bandleader.
Giti Pashaei, 54, Iranian singer and musician, breast cancer.
Mariya Polyakova, 87, Soviet colonel and spy.
Ioannis Toumbas, 94, Greek naval officer and politician.
Helen Varcoe, 88, English swimmer and Olympic medalist.

8
Carroll Best, American banjo player.
Prem Bhatia, 72, Indian diplomat and journalist.
Jacques Isorni, 83, French lawyer and memoirist.
Marshal Royal, 82, American alto saxophonist and clarinetist, brother of Ernie Royal.
Bill Spivey, 66, American basketball player.
Teresa Teng, 42, Taiwanese singer, asthma.

9
Jeanne Darville, 70, Danish film actress.
Alf Henrikson, 89, Swedish author, poet and translator.
Percy Mansell, 75, South African cricket player.
Charles Monteith, 74, British literary editor.
Kanhiyalal Prabhakar Mishra, 88, Indian journalist, writer and freedom fighter.
John Elwood Price, 59, American composer, pianist, ethnomusicologist, and music teacher.
Earl H. Pritchard, 87, American scholar of China.
Magda Rurac, 76, Romanian tennis player in the 1940s and 1950s.

10
Brigitte Alexander, 83, German-born Mexican author, actress, director and translator.
Harold Berens, 92, British comedian and character actor.
Georgios Candilis, 82, Greek-French architect and urbanist.
Ilio DiPaolo, 68, Italian professional wrestler and restaurateur.
Karl Drewo, 65, Austrian jazz saxophonist.
Alexander Elbrächter, 87, German politician and member of the Bundestag.
Freddy Fernández, 61, Mexican film and television actor, esophageal cancer.
Duncan McKenzie, 43, American convicted murderer, execution by lethal injection.
Juan Manuel López Mella, 30, Spanish motorcycle racer, traffic collision.
Jimmy Raney, 67, American jazz guitarist.
Carlos Rinaldi, 80, Argentine film director, film editor and screenwriter.
Steffie Spira, 86, Austrian-German actress.
Gil Steinke, 76, American football player and coach.
Joe Vetrano, 76, American gridiron football player.
Dicky Zulkarnaen, 55, Indonesian actor.

11
Reza Abdoh, 32, Iranian playwright and director, AIDS.
David Avidan, 61, Israeli poet and playwright.
José T. Joya, 63, Filipino abstract artist.
Arthur Lubin, 96, American film director.
Boris Pash, 94, United States Army military intelligence officer.
John Phillips, 80, British actor.
Ivo Samkalden, 82, Dutch politician and jurist.
Bill Shelton, 92, Australian rules football player.
Pete Tinsley, 82, American gridiron football player.

12
Len Beadell, 72, Australian surveyor, road builder, bushman, artist and author.
Giorgio Belladonna, 71, Italian bridge player.
John Blight, 81, Australian poet.
Andrei Boltnev, 49, Soviet/Russian actor, stroke.
Arnold Goodman, Baron Goodman, 81, British lawyer and political advisor.
Bogo Grafenauer, 79, Slovenian historian.
Ștefan Kovács, 74, Romanian football player and coach.
Vernon L. Lowrance, 86, United States Navy vice admiral.
Mia Martini, 47, Italian singer and songwriter, heart failure.
Adolfo Pedernera, 76, Argentinian footballer.
Maria Teresa Riedl, 57, Italian tennis player.
Marcel Rubin, 89, Austrian composer and music critic.
Karl Vennberg, 85, Swedish poet, writer and translator.

13
Francisco Moreno Capdevila, 69, Spanish-Mexican artist.
Alan Maley, 64, British visual effects artist (Raiders of the Lost Ark, Bedknobs and Broomsticks, The Spy Who Loved Me), Oscar winner (1972), heart attack.
Robert Marley, 85, Jamaican cricket player.
Teddy Sandford, 84, English football player.
Hao Wang, 73, Chinese-American logician, philosopher, and mathematician.

14
Christian B. Anfinsen, 79, American biochemist and Nobel Prize for Chemistry laureate, heart attack.
Rodrigo Arenas Betancourt, 75, Colombian sculptor, liver cancer.
Jessy Blackburn, 101, British aviation pioneer.
Mary Brazier, 90, American neuroscientist.
Ted James, 76, American politician.
Jean Laurent, 88, French football player.
Tommy Prothro, 74, American football coach, cancer.
Hamilton Lavity Stoutt, 66, British Virgin Islander politician and first Chief Minister of the British Virgin Islands.
Richard Udugama, 83, Sri Lankan military leader, politician and diplomat.

15
Lionel Brodie, 77, Australian tennis player.
Benjamin Bubar Jr., 77, American politician and ordained minister.
Dora Chapman, 84, Australian painter.
Seymour Durst, 81, American real estate investor and developer.
Billy Lott, 60, American gridiron football player.
Taizan Maezumi, 64, Japanese Zen Buddhist teacher and rōshi, drowned.
Grace Matthews, 84, Canadian actress in the era of old-time radio and the early years of television.
Fred G. Moritt, 89, American lawyer, singer, composer, lyricist and politician.
Eric Porter, 67, English actor, colorectal cancer.
Luis Antonio Ramírez, 72, Puerto Rican composer.
Pia Tassinari, 91, Italian opera singer who was first a soprano and later a mezzo-soprano.

16
Edris Allan, 86, Jamaican community worker, political figure and women's rights advocate.
Red Amick, 66, American racecar driver.
Harry E. Bergold Jr., 63, American diplomat and ambassador.
Parelius Hjalmar Bang Berntsen, 85, Norwegian politician for the Labour Party.
Ray Bower, 72, Australian rules footballer.
Lola Flores, 72, Spanish singer, dancer and actress, breast cancer.
Gertrude Grob-Prandl, 77, Austrian soprano.
Ragnhild Hatton, 82, Norwegian-British professor of International History at the London School of Economics.
Raymond Lyttleton, 84, British mathematician and theoretical astronomer.
Thomas Lee Ward, 59, American convicted murderer, execution by lethal injection.

17
Toe Blake, 82, Canadian ice hockey player and coach in the National Hockey League, Alzheimer's disease.
Girvies Davis, 37, American serial killer, execution by lethal injection.
Geoffrey Dickens, 63, British politician, liver cancer.
Joe McKenney, 90, American football player and coach.
Catfish Metkovich, 74, American baseball player (Boston Red Sox, Cleveland Indians, Chicago White Sox, Pittsburgh Pirates, Chicago Cubs and Milwaukee Braves).
Leonid Ivanovich Volkov, 60, Ice hockey player.

18
Brinsley Le Poer Trench, 8th Earl of Clancarty, 83, Irish peer and proponent of the Hollow Earth concept.
Elisha Cook Jr., 91, American actor (The Maltese Falcon, Rosemary's Baby, Shane), stroke.
Francis Judd Cooke, 84, American composer, organist, cellist, pianist, conductor, and choir director.
Alexander Godunov, 45, Russian ballet dancer and actor (Die Hard, Witness, The Money Pit), hepatitis.
Robert Harris, 95, English actor.
Jack Kramer, 77, American baseball player.
Henri Laborit, 80, French surgeon, neurobiologist, writer and philosopher.
Elizabeth Montgomery, 62, American actress (Bewitched, The Legend of Lizzie Borden, A Case of Rape), colorectal cancer.
Dorothy Poynton-Hill, 79, American diver.
Sabine Sinjen, 52, German film actress, cancer.
Michael P. W. Stone, 69, British-American businessman and government administrator.
Tor Ulven, 41, Norwegian poet, suicide.
Peter van de Kamp, 93, Dutch astronomer.

19
Robert Sinclair Dietz, 80, American geologist.
Derek Ford, 62, English film director and writer.
Hans Jürgen Kiebach, 64, German production designer, art director and set decorator.
Trevor Lewis, 75, British water polo player and Olympian.
Robert Riger, 70, American sports illustrator, photographer, television director, and cinematographer.
Nico van Gageldonk, 81, Dutch cyclist and Olympian.

20
Maurice Banide, 90, French football player and manager.
Les Cowie, 70, Australian rugby player.
Oscar Gjøslien, 85, Norwegian cross-country skier.
Burton Jastram, 84, American rower.
Ulysses Kay, 78, American composer, Parkinson's disease.
Florijan Matekalo, 75, Yugoslav and Croatian football player.
Les Smith, 77, English football player, Alzheimer's disease.

21
Les Aspin, 56, American politician and member of the U.S. House of Representatives, stroke.
Larry Hillblom, 52, American businessman and co-founder of DHL.
Chaudhry Altaf Hussain, 65, Pakistani politician.
Giuseppe Peruchetti, 87, Italian football player and coach.
Agnelo Rossi, 82, Brazilian Cardinal of the Roman Catholic Church.
Annie M. G. Schmidt, 84, Dutch writer, heart attack.
Mükbile Sultan, 83, Ottoman princess and granddaughter of Mehmed V.

22
Robert Flemyng, 83, British actor, pneumonia.
Claude Itzykson, 57, French theoretical physicist.
Butch Morse, 84, American gridiron football player.
Derek Reeves, 60, English football player.

23
Pierre Baratin, 74, French cyclist.
Ross Flood, 84, American wrestler and Olympian medalist.
Patricia Ford, 74, Northern Ireland Ulster Unionist Party politician.
Dan Fortmann, 79, American gridiron football player.
Gavriil Kachalin, 84, Soviet/Russian football player and coach.
Mick Pyne, 54, English jazz pianist.
Torolv Solheim, 87, Norwegian resistance member during World War II, essayist, and politician.

24
Ole Borge, 79, Norwegian jurist and resistance member during World War II.
Paul J. Kramer, 91, American biologist and plant physiologist.
Ichisada Miyazaki, 93, Japanese historian.
Youakim Moubarac, 70, Lebanese Islamologist, Orientalist and Arabist.
Harold Wilson, 79, Prime Minister of the United Kingdom, Alzheimer's disease and colorectal cancer.

25
Jack Allen, 87, English film, theatre and television actor.
Élie Bayol, 81, French racing driver.
Veronica Bulshefski, 79, Director of the United States Navy Nurse Corps.
Ted Calland, 62, English professional footballer.
Boyden Carpenter, 86, American hillbilly and bluegrass artist.
Krešimir Ćosić, 46, Croatian basketball player and coach, non-Hodgkin's lymphoma.
Dick Curless, 63, American country music singer, stomach cancer.
Alice Day, 89, American film actress.
Dany Robin, 68, French actress, domestic fire.

26
Tony Azito, 46, American dancer and actor (The Addams Family, Moonstruck, Union City), HIV/AIDS.
David S. Breslow, 78, American industrial chemist best known for his work on polymers.
Friz Freleng, 89, American animator (Looney Tunes).
Edmund Hansen, 94, Danish track cyclist and Olympian.
Kamukara Purushothaman, 64, Indian singer.
Sigmund Skard, 91, Norwegian poet, essayist and professor of American literature.
Mordechai Surkis, 87, Israeli politician.
Eriprando Visconti, 62, Italian film director, screenwriter, and producer, pulmonary emphysema.

27
Ștefan Bănică Sr., 61, Romanian actor.
Severn Darden, 65, American comedian and actor (Conquest of the Planet of the Apes, Back to School, Saturday the 14th), heart failure.
Epi Drost, 49, Dutch association football player and manager, heart attack.
László Kalmár, 63, Hungarian composer and editor.
Mike McQuay, 45, American science fiction writer, heart attack.
Christopher B. "Stubb" Stubblefield, 64, American barbecue restaurateur.

28
Roy Ankrah, 69, Ghanaian boxer who won the British Empire super featherweight title.
Helen Ballard, 87, British horticulturist.
Gunnar Huseby, 71, Icelandic track and field athlete.
Henning Kronstam, 60, Danish ballet dancer, ballet master and company director.
Ernie Lewis, 70, American gridiron football player.
Irfan Ljubijankić, 42, Bosnian classical music composer, politician and diplomat, killed in action.
Jean Muir, 66, British fashion designer, breast cancer.
Arifin C. Noer, 54, Indonesian poet, theater director and film producer, liver cancer.
Daniela Rocca, 57, Italian actress, model and writer, heart attack.
Matthew E. Welsh, 82, American politician.

29
Santiago Armada, 57, Cuban artist and designer.
Juan Boria, 90, Puerto Rican poet.
Ralph Gustafson, 85, Canadian poet and professor at Bishop's University.
Mike Pentz, 70, South African-British physicist and activist in the peace movement, leukemia.
Archibald Russell, 90, British aerospace engineer.
Glen Selbo, 69, American basketball and baseball player.
Margaret Chase Smith, 97, American politician, lung cancer.
Kurt Weiß, 89, German field hockey player and Olympian.

30
Robert Alexander Anderson, 100, American composer.
Glenn Burke, 42, American Major League Baseball player who was the first to come out as gay, AIDS complications.
Ted Drake, 82, English footballer.
Lofty England, 83, British engineer and motor company manager.
Antonio Flores, 33, Spanish singer-songwriter and actor, drug overdose.
William McVey, 89, American sculptor, animalier and teacher.
Ray Novotny, 87, American football player and coach.
Giuseppe Sartore, 58, Italian racing cyclist.
Philip Sherrard, 72, British author, translator and philosopher.
Bobby Stokes, 44, English footballer, pneumonia.
Ștefana Velisar Teodoreanu, 97, Romanian novelist, poet and translator.
Arthur M. Young, 89, American inventor, helicopter pioneer, cosmologist, philosopher, astrologer, and author.

31
Roy Beddington, 85, British painter, illustrator, poet, writer on fishing, and journalist. 
Guillermo Bermúdez, 71, Colombian architect.
Norm Brown, 76, American baseball player.
Stanley Elkin, 65, American novelist, short story writer, and essayist, heart attack.
Emilio García Gómez, 89, Spanish Arabist, literary historian and critic.
Ingrid Semmingsen, 85, Norwegian historian.
Pavel Šivic, 87, Slovenian composer, concert pianist, and music educator.
Warren Sonbert, 47, American experimental filmmaker, complications from AIDS

References 

1995-05
 05